Glenwood Township is a township in 
Mills County, Iowa, USA.

References

Mills County, Iowa
Townships in Iowa